Methyltransferase like 4 is a protein that in humans is encoded by the METTL4 gene.

References

Further reading